Uraspis uraspis is a species of jack in the family Carangidae. It is found in the Indo-Pacific.

Distribution and habitat
This fish is found in the Indo-Pacific. Its range extends from the Red Sea and the Persian Gulf to Sri Lanka in the Indian Ocean, and from the Philippines to the Ryukyu Islands in Japan and east towards Hawaii.

Description

References

External links
 Smith, J.L.B. 1962. Ichthyological Bulletin; No. 26: The rare "Furred-Tongue" Uraspis uraspis (Gunther) from South Africa, and other new records from there. Grahamstown: Department of Ichthyology, Rhodes University.

uraspis
Fish of the Indian Ocean
Fish of the Pacific Ocean
Fish described in 1860
Taxa named by Albert Günther